666 Park Avenue is an American supernatural drama television series that aired on ABC from September 30, 2012, to July 13, 2013. The series was developed and produced by David Wilcox, and was loosely based upon the novel of the same name by author Gabriella Pierce. The show stars Rachael Taylor, Dave Annable, Vanessa Williams, and Terry O'Quinn and follows a couple who learns that the Manhattan apartment building that they just moved into, including its upscale tenants, might be possessed by a mysterious demonic force.

The elaborate Beaux-Arts building located on the old money Upper East Side of Manhattan called "The Drake" in the series is an actual apartment building, The Ansonia in Upper West Side.

It aired on Sunday evenings at 10:00 pm Eastern/9:00 pm Central, with the series Revenge serving as its lead in. On November 16, 2012, after the seventh episode aired, ABC announced that the series had been canceled, but that it would finish its 13-episode run.

On December 21, 2012, after the ninth episode aired, ABC announced that the series had been removed from its schedule, with the remaining four episodes to be burned off in the dead of the summer 2013 schedule. The original time slot was taken by Happy Endings and Don't Trust the B---- in Apartment 23. The final four episodes were first broadcast in Spain, then aired in Australia, New Zealand and the United Kingdom, before airing in the United States from June 22 to July 13, 2013.

Plot
666 Park Avenue focuses on Jane Van Veen (Rachael Taylor) and her partner Henry Martin (Dave Annable), the new co-managers of the Drake residential hotel, located at 999 Park Avenue. The Drake is owned by mysterious billionaire couple Gavin (Terry O'Quinn) and Olivia Doran (Vanessa Williams). The plot follows both Jane and Henry, and the other residents of the Drake who live in the shadow of the dark supernatural forces of the Drake and its owners.

Cast and characters

Main
 Rachael Taylor as Jane Van Veen, the new co-manager of the building
 Dave Annable as Henry Martin, the new co-manager of the building
 Robert Buckley as Brian Leonard, a playwright, who lives in the building with his wife Louise
 Mercedes Masohn as Louise Leonard, Brian's wife, a photographer
 Helena Mattsson as Alexis Blume, assistant and friend of Louise
 Samantha Logan as Nona Clark, a resident with a unique gift
 Erik Palladino as Tony DeMeo, the doorman of the building
 Vanessa Williams as Olivia Doran, the coldly beautiful and sophisticated wife of the building's owner
 Terry O'Quinn as Gavin Doran, the building's mysterious owner and the series' primary antagonist

Recurring
Richard Short as Harlan Moore
 Misha Kuznetsov as Kandinsky
 Teddy Sears as Detective Hayden Cooper
 Aubrey Dollar as Annie Morgan
 Enrique Murciano as Dr. Todd Scott Evans
 Tessa Thompson as Laurel Harris / Sasha Doran
 Nick Chinlund as Victor Shaw

Episodes

Ratings

Production
Series star Vanessa Williams stated that she perceives the characters of Gavin and Olivia Doran as a "supernatural" Bernie and Ruth Madoff. "It's a world that I wanted to explore," she said. "It's the Upper East Side. It's luxurious. It's a couple that are very powerful. I thought about the Madoffs immediately because they were extremely wealthy. They had incredible land holdings all over that people knew about and knew that they had a great amount of wealth. And then we all saw the dark side and what happened and how they created their empire."

Hurricane Sandy
When Hurricane Sandy hit New York City in late October 2012, the sets of 666 Park Avenue were damaged.

Criticism
One Million Moms, a Christian activist group known for trying to mobilize conservative women in protest against various media outlets, made 666 Park Avenue a target of its protestation. The organization, having taken exception to the show's use of the mark of the devil and believing that exposure to it was inappropriate, prompted its members to e-mail the sponsors of the network urging them to withdraw revenue from the show.

Cancellation
On November 16, 2012, 666 Park Avenue was canceled by ABC. The network aired the 13 episodes produced, but ultimately decided to pass on the two extra scripts that were ordered. On November 21, 2012, it was announced that producers had been given enough notice of the show's cancellation that they were reworking the final episode to function as a series finale and give the fans closure. However in the east, the finale was not seen in full on ABC, as the network broke into the last few minutes of the series for a bulletin regarding the verdict in the Trial of George Zimmerman (it would be seen in full in time zones westward and its streaming venues).

Reception
Metacritic gave it an average score of 62% based on 22 reviews.

International broadcasts
 In Canada, the show aired in simulcast on City.
 In Quebec, Canada, the show aired on Ztélé.
 In Finland, the show premiered on MTV3 on 
 In India, the show premiered on Zee Café on 
After the third episode it was shifted to the Sunday 11pm time slot. The series finale aired on April 21, 2013.
 In Portugal, the show aired on TVCineSeries.
 In France, the show premiered on Série Club on November 4, 2013. The series finale aired on December 9, 2013. In 2014, the show aired on HD1.
 In Spain, the show aired on Calle 13
The final episode was broadcast on 14 May 2013.
 In Bulgaria, the show started airing on bTV Lady on March 2, 2015, from Monday to Friday at 21:00.
 In Greece, the show airing on HOL TV in 2015-6 on demand  on cable TV.
 In the Philippines, the show aired on GMA News TV by 2021.

References

External links
 

2010s American drama television series
2010s American horror television series
2010s American supernatural television series
2012 American television series debuts
2013 American television series endings
American Broadcasting Company original programming
Demons in television
English-language television shows
Serial drama television series
Television shows based on American novels
Television series by Alloy Entertainment
Television series by Warner Bros. Television Studios
Television shows set in Manhattan